Marimatha piscimala is a moth of the family Noctuidae first described by Clifford D. Ferris and J. Donald Lafontaine in 2010. It is found from south-eastern Texas to Arizona southward to Panama.

Adults are on wing from mid-April to mid-October, probably in several generations.

Etymology
The species name is derived from the Latin for fish (piscis) and jaw (mala) and refers to the fish-jaw like appearance of the male valva.

External links

Noctuinae